Schistura spiloptera is a species of ray-finned fish in the genus Schistura It is found in shallow, clear, fast-flowing water over rocky bottoms in upland streams where it feeds on insect larvae, some algae and phytoplankton. It has only been recorded from central Vietnam.

References

S
Fish described in 1846